Martina is a female given name, the female form of Martin.

People with the given name 
 Martina (empress), the niece and second wife and empress of the Byzantine emperor Heraclius
Martina Arroyo (born 1937), American operatic soprano
 Martina Ćorković (born 1993) Croatian handball player
 Martina de la Puente (born 1975), Spanish shot putter
 Martina Gedeck (born 1961), German actress
 Martina Gmür (born 1979), Swiss visual artist
 Martina Hingis (born 1980), Swiss tennis player
 Martina Johansson (born 1975), Swedish politician
 Martina Maggio (born 2001), Italian artistic gymnast
 Martina McBride (born 1966), American country music singer
 Martina Müller (born 1980), German footballer
 Martina Müller, (born 1982), German tennis player
 Martina Návratilová (born 1956), Czech-American tennis player
 Martina Portocarrero (1949-2022), Peruvian folk singer, cultural researcher, politician
 Martina Proeber (born 1963), German Olympic diver
 Martina of Rome, Christian martyr (died ca. 266)
 Martina Schumacher (born 1972), German painter and conceptual artist
 Martina von Schwerin, Swedish salonist
 Martina Stella, Italian spokesperson and actress
 Martina Stoessel (born 1997), Argentine actress and singer
 Martina Topley-Bird, British singer

Fictional characters 
 Martina Crespi from the anime/manga Strike Witches
 Martina Crowe from Trenton Lee Stewart's children's book series The Mysterious Benedict Society

See also 
 Martina (surname)
 Martin (name)
 Martino (given name)

Italian feminine given names
Spanish feminine given names
English feminine given names
Swedish feminine given names
German feminine given names
French feminine given names
Czech feminine given names
Croatian feminine given names